Baicalellia is a genus of flatworms belonging to the family Provorticidae.

The species of this genus are found in America.

Species

Species:

Baicalellia albicauda 
Baicalellia anchoragensis 
Baicalellia baicali

References

Platyhelminthes